"All Is Found" is a song from the 2019 Disney film Frozen II. The song is performed by Evan Rachel Wood as Queen Iduna, the mother of Anna and Elsa, and written by Kristen Anderson-Lopez and Robert Lopez.

Production
The song was the first to be composed for the film, and its composers sought inspiration from "Rock-a-bye Baby" and Norwegian lullabies.  It was written before Wood was cast.

International versions 
As happened in Moana with a Tahitian, Māori and Hawaiian version, a special Sami dubbing was made specifically for the movie, given the inspiration it took from Sami culture, with the song "All is Found" being performed by Norwegian singer Eva Jeanette Iversen with the title "Gávnnat Buot". Norwegian-Swedish composer Christine Hals, who had previously taken part in the composition of the soundtrack for the movie Frozen, writing the lyrics in Old Norse for the song "Heimr Árnadalr" and performing kulning for Beck to use it in his score, returned in the sequel to voice Queen Iduna in the Norwegian dubbing, singing the Norwegian version of the song with the title "I Elven Finnes Alt/In The River There Is Everything".

Kacey Musgraves version

A version by American country singer Kacey Musgraves is played over the end credits of the film. Most dubbings played this version over the end credits, though the song numbers 6 more versions in other languages. The Tamil and Telugu versions were both performed by Indian singer Sunitha Sarathy, who also dubbed Iduna in the same languages, while actress Smita Malhotra both performed the end credits version and provided Iduna's voice in Hindi.

Charts

Evan Rachel Wood version

Kacey Musgraves version

Certifications

Reception
The Los Angeles Times deemed it the fourth best song from the film. Vox called the song a "beautiful refrain".

References 

2019 songs
Kacey Musgraves songs
Songs written by Kristen Anderson-Lopez
Songs written by Robert Lopez
Songs from Frozen (franchise)
Disney songs
Songs written for animated films
Songs written for films
Walt Disney Records singles